Nashville  or high-strung tuning refers to the practice of replacing the wound E, A, D and G strings on a six-string guitar with lighter gauge strings to allow tuning an octave higher than standard. This is usually achieved by using one string from each of the six courses of a twelve-string set, using the higher string for those courses tuned in octaves.

The Pink Floyd song "Hey You" from the album The Wall and the Kansas song "Dust in the Wind"  from their Point of Know Return album are notable for using this form of guitar tuning. In "Hey You", David Gilmour replaced the low E string with a second high E (not a 12-string set, low E's octave string) such that it was two octaves up. The Rolling Stones' "Wild Horses" features both a 12-string guitar played by Keith Richards and a guitar with Nashville tuning played by Mick Taylor. Jumpin' Jack Flash features two acoustic guitars, one Nashville strung, overdriven through a cassette recorder. James Williamson used Nashville tuning on "Gimme Danger" on Raw Power by the Stooges. Elliott Smith used a variant of Nashville tuning with a twelve-string guitar on XO for the song "Tomorrow Tomorrow." Pat Metheny is known for using Nashville tuning on several occasions, notably his song "Phase Dance" from his group's debut album. Similarly, Andy Fairweather Low used a high-strung guitar on his 1975 UK hit single "Wide Eyed and Legless", taken from his La Booga Rooga album.

Other songs featuring the tuning include:
 William, It Was Really Nothing, London and The Headmaster Ritual by The Smiths

See also
Twelve-string guitar

References

External links
 Directions for tuning a standard six string to Nashville tuning

Guitar tunings

nl:Nashville tuning
pt:Afinação Nashville